In mathematics and numerical analysis,  an adaptive step size is used in some methods for the numerical solution of ordinary differential equations (including the special case of numerical integration) in order to control the errors of the method and to ensure stability properties such as A-stability. 
Using an adaptive stepsize is of particular importance when there is a large variation in the size of the derivative. 
For example, when modeling the motion of a satellite about the earth as a standard Kepler orbit, a fixed time-stepping method such as the Euler method may be sufficient. 
However things are more difficult if one wishes to model the motion of a spacecraft taking into account both the Earth and the Moon as in the Three-body problem. 
There, scenarios emerge where one can take large time steps when the spacecraft is far from the Earth and Moon, but if the spacecraft gets close to colliding with one of the planetary bodies, then small time steps are needed.  Romberg's method and Runge–Kutta–Fehlberg are examples of a numerical integration methods which use an adaptive stepsize.

Example
For simplicity, the following example uses the simplest integration method, the Euler method; in practice, higher-order methods such as Runge–Kutta methods are preferred due to their superior convergence and stability properties.

Consider the initial value problem
  
where y and f may denote vectors (in which case this equation represents a system of coupled ODEs in several variables).

We are given the function f(t,y) and the initial conditions (a, ya), and we are interested in finding the solution at t = b. Let y(b) denote the exact solution at b, and let yb denote the solution that we compute. We write , where  is the error in the numerical solution.

For a sequence (tn) of values of t, with tn = a + nh, the Euler method gives approximations to the corresponding values of y(tn) as
 
The local truncation error of this approximation is defined by
  
and by Taylor's theorem, it can be shown that (provided f is sufficiently smooth) the local truncation error is proportional to the square of the step size:
  
where c is some constant of proportionality.

The value of c is not known to us. Let us now apply Euler's method again with a different step size to generate a second approximation to y(tn+1).
Take the new step size to be one half of the original step size, and apply two steps of Euler's method. This second solution is presumably more accurate. Since we have to apply Euler's method twice, the local error is (in the worst case) twice the original error.
  
  
  
  

Here, we assume error factor  is constant over the interval . Subtracting solutions gives the error estimate:

  

This local error estimate is third order accurate.

The local error estimate can be used to decide how stepsize  should be modified to achieve the desired accuracy.

  

The  is a safety factor to ensure success on the next try. The minimum and maximum are to prevent extreme changes from the previous stepsize. If , we consider the step successful, and the error estimate is used to improve the solution:

 

This solution is actually third order accurate in the local scope (second order in the global scope), but since there is no error estimate for it, this doesn't help in reducing the number of steps. This technique is called Richardson extrapolation.

A drawback is that the step size may become prohibitively small, especially when using the low-order Euler method.

Similar methods can be developed for higher order methods, such as the 4th-order Runge–Kutta method. Also, a global error tolerance can be achieved by scaling the local error to global scope.

Embedded error estimates

Adaptive stepsize methods that use a so-called 'embedded' error estimate include the Bogacki–Shampine, Runge–Kutta–Fehlberg, Cash–Karp and Dormand–Prince methods. These methods are considered to be more computationally efficient, but have lower accuracy in their error estimates.

To illustrate the ideas of embedded method, consider the following scheme which update :
  
  
The next step  is predicted from the previous information .

For embedded RK method, computation of  includes a lower order RK method . The error
then can be simply written as
  

 is the unnormalized error. To normalize it, we compare it against a user-defined tolerance, which
consists of the absolute tolerance and relative tolerance:
 
 
Then we compare the normalized error  against 1 to get the predicted :
 
The parameter q is the order corresponding to the RK method , which has lower order.
The above prediction formula is plausible in a sense that it enlarges the step if the estimated local error is smaller than the
tolerance and it shrinks the step otherwise.

The description given above is a simplified procedures used in the stepsize control for explicit RK solvers. A more detailed treatment
can be found in Hairer's textbook. The ODE solver in many programming languages uses this procedure as the default strategy for adaptive stepsize control, which adds other engineering parameters to make the system more stable.

See also 
Adaptive quadrature
Adaptive numerical differentiation

References

Further reading 

William H. Press, Saul A. Teukolsky, William T. Vetterling, Brian P. Flannery, Numerical Recipes in C, Second Edition, CAMBRIDGE UNIVERSITY PRESS, 1992. 
Kendall E. Atkinson, Numerical Analysis, Second Edition, John Wiley & Sons, 1989. 

Numerical differential equations
Numerical analysis